The Williams FW22 was the car with which the Williams team competed in the 2000 Formula One World Championship.

Design 
An evolution of the previous season's FW21, it marked the first year of the team's collaboration with BMW as an engine supplier, a partnership that would last until the end of 2005; this was also the first Formula One car since  to use BMW engines.

Along with its new Compaq sponsorship, the FW22 introduced a dark blue on white livery that harkened back to that of the similarly BMW-powered Brabham cars in the early 1980s.

Racing history 
The FW22 proved to be extremely promising in the hands of young German driver Ralf Schumacher and English debutant Jenson Button. Schumacher achieved eight points finishes (including three third places) and Button six; at the Brazilian Grand Prix, the Englishman became the youngest driver at that time to score a World Championship point, aged 20 years and two months. Schumacher finished fifth in the Drivers' Championship with 24 points while Button finished eighth with 12; the combined 36 points placed Williams third in the Constructors' Championship, behind the dominant Ferrari and McLaren teams.

Complete Formula One results
(key) (results in bold indicate pole position)

References

Williams FW22
2000 Formula One season cars